O Sertão das Memórias, released as Landscapes of Memory in English-speaking market, is a 1997 Brazilian documentary film directed by José Araújo. It tells the stories of Antero Marques Araújo and Maria Emilce Pinto. It participated in the Singapore International Film Festival and the 4th International Kerala Film Festival.

Plot summary
O Sertão das Memórias is a black-and-white film that tells the story of two Sertanejos, the inhabitants of Sertão. Maria is the female reincarnation of Jesus, representing the strength of the Sartanejo women. She invites the Beatas (holy women) on a mission of prayer for which they journey through the countryside, witnessing social unrest among the population. Maria meets the hero of the peasants, the strong worker Antero whose history intermingles with hers. Through mythical dreams, visions, and stories heard along their journey, we witness the unfolding of Biblical prophecy in which Old Testament texts mingle with the folktales of the Sertão. The film aims to show how people try to find strength in myths, art, and religion when faced with the harsh realities of life.

External links

The documentary at Allmovie.

1997 films
Brazilian documentary films
1990s Portuguese-language films
Documentary films about religion
1997 documentary films